is a passenger railway station located in the city of Sanuki, Kagawa Prefecture, Japan. It is operated by JR Shikoku and has the station number "T14".

Lines
The station is served by the JR Shikoku Kōtoku Line and is located 30.4 km from the beginning of the line at Takamatsu. Only local services stop at the station.

Layout
Tsuruwa Station consists of two opposed side platforms serving two tracks. There is no station building, but each platform has a weather shelter for waiting passengers. There is no direct link between the platforms. A road level crossing at one end of the platforms is used to cross the tracks. On either side of the level crossing, separate ramps lead up to each platform. A bike shed is provided next to the tracks.

History
Japanese National Railways (JNR) opened Tsuruwa Station on 1 October 1961 as an added stop on the existing Kōtoku Line. With the privatization of JNR on 1 April 1987, JR Shikoku assumed control and the stop was upgraded to a full station.

Surrounding area
Japan Dolphin Center
Former Sanuki Municipal Tsuruha Elementary School

See also
List of railway stations in Japan

References

External links

Station timetable

Railway stations in Kagawa Prefecture
Railway stations in Japan opened in 1961
Sanuki, Kagawa